This is a list of films which placed number-one at the weekend box office in Argentina during 2016. Amounts are in American dollars.

Highest-grossing films

See also
 List of American films — American films by year
 List of Argentine films — Argentine films by year

References

Argentina
2016